Dominador Calumarde (born 23 December 1946) is a Filipino boxer. He competed at the 1964 Summer Olympics and the 1968 Summer Olympics. At the 1964 Summer Olympics, he defeated Wang Chee-yen of the Republic of China, before losing to Jo Dong-gi of South Korea.

References

External links
 

1946 births
Living people
Filipino male boxers
Olympic boxers of the Philippines
Boxers at the 1964 Summer Olympics
Boxers at the 1968 Summer Olympics
Sportspeople from Cebu
Bantamweight boxers